Məşədilər or Meshadlyar or Mashadlyar may refer to:
Məşədilər, Jalilabad, Azerbaijan
Məşədilər, Tovuz (disambiguation)
Məşədilər (40° 51' N 45° 42' E), Tovuz, Azerbaijan
Məşədilər (40° 53' N 45° 45' E), Tovuz, Azerbaijan
Meshadilyar, Azerbaijan
Əfətli, Azerbaijan